Tricky TV is a British television show that aired on CITV from 2005 to 2010, presented by magician Stephen Mulhern. The show featured street magic, pranks, illusions, and step-by-step how-to guides for magic tricks.

Format
The show featured magic tricks such as making a tank vanish or making an entire football team appear. The "wicked wind-ups" segment included a gorilla that came to life, a cinema with exploding popcorn, and unstoppable drinks machines. "Beat the Cheat" exposed classic confidence tricks. Each show usually closed with a performance of a classic "grand illusion", such as sawing a woman in half.

In Series 1 and 2, each episode featured one or more special guest celebrities, who often took part in a number of tricks during the show, and sometimes participated in the show's closing illusion. In series 3, the format was redesigned with Mulhern presenting and a 'Tricky Team' of young magicians performing the illusions.

Production
Tricky TV was first broadcast in the 4pm slot on ITV from 5 September 2005.

The show was produced by The Foundation, the same company that produced Finger Tips, Globo Loco and Holly & Stephen's Saturday Showdown, which also starred Stephen Mulhern.

The show featured frequent appearances by celebrities, and used glamour models and bodybuilders as magician's assistants. It was also noted for featuring viewers or their mothers in tricks.

The creative consultant was Paul Andrews. The show's executive producer was Vanessa Hill for The Foundation. Series 2 was produced by Ian France and directed by Paul Andrews. Series 3 was co-produced, written and directed by Paul Andrews.

Transmissions

Episodes

Series 1
Series 1 consisted of ten episodes, and ran from 5 September 2005 to 7 November 2005.

Series 2
Series 2 ran from 10 March – 2 June 2006

Series 3
Series 3 consisted of twenty episodes, and ran from 14 September – 15 October 2010. Episodes 1-14 were presented by Stephen Williams.

Tricky Quickies
Tricky Quickies was a cut-down version of the show with a duration of five minutes. Series 1 had 10 episodes, while series 2 had 15 episodes.

The Quick Trick Show
The Quick Trick Show was a sister show of Tricky TV, also presented by Mulhern, and also featuring magic tricks, "wicked wind-ups", illusions, and step-by-step guides to tricks. Five series were produced and aired on CITV between 1999 and 2002.

Series Guide

International broadcast
Tricky TV was aired in Southeast Asia on Cartoon Network Asia, in Germany on Super RTL, in the Arab World on MBC 4 and MBC Action, in Iran on MBC Persia, Iceland on Stöð 2, in Norway on NRK Super, in Canada on VRAK.TV, in India on Nickelodeon, in Hong Kong on ATV World  and in Japan on Disney XD.

External links

References

2005 British television series debuts
2010 British television series endings
British television magic series
ITV children's television shows
Television series by Banijay